Perifollicular mucinosis is a cutaneous condition characterized by mucinosis, and described in HIV-infected patients. It is usually found in adults and rarely seen in children. It can have many causes.

See also 
 Eccrine mucinosis
 List of cutaneous conditions

References 

Mucinoses